Beartooth EP is an album released by the Long Beach, California band, Boris Smile. The album was released by Count Your Lucky Stars Records in 2008.

Track listing
All songs written by A. Wesley Chung and Boris Smile.
"Beartooth (spooky version)" - 3:35
"Hour of the Wolf" - 2:49
"Tut Tut" - 5:54
"Program me to Love" - 4:14
"Books of Blank Pages" - 3:39

Personnel
A. Wesley Chung vocals, acoustic guitar, percussion, piano, saxophone
Abigail Davidson: vocals, percussion
Amy Sundahl: vocals
Avi Buffalo: electric guitar, looper, vocals
Beth Balmer: violin, viola, cello
Doug Brown: bass
Hannah Ellis: vocals
Jessie Flasschoen; vocals
Jonathan Holden: vocals
Jon Palsgrove: drums, vocals
Meagan Christy: trumpet
Rebecca Coleman: vocals
Ryan Smernoff: vocals
Seth Shafer: keyboard/synth, tuba
Stevie Kugelberg: bass

2008 albums